The  is a 16,033-capacity multi-purpose stadium in Tottori, Tottori. The stadium is home to J3 League side Gainare Tottori. The stadium hosted Ecuador's national selection during the 2002 FIFA World Cup.

It was formerly known as Tottori Stadium. Since April 2008 it has been called Tottori Bank Bird Stadium for the naming rights.

The stadium has also hosted rugby union games. It is one of the few soccer-specific stadiums built in Japan before the 2002 FIFA World Cup boom, and as such Gainare Tottori uses it as part of its bid to be promoted to the J.League, since their home stadium in Yonago was built for athletics and the town has no money for upgrading it.

References

External links

 The Rising Sun News - Tottori Stadium

Tottori (city)
Football venues in Japan
Multi-purpose stadiums in Japan
Sports venues in Tottori Prefecture
Sports venues completed in 1995
Gainare Tottori
1995 establishments in Japan